William Pattenden (31 October 1747 at East Peckham, Kent – 1817 at Hadlow, buried 2 April 1817 at East Peckham) was an English professional cricketer who played for Kent.  He made 7 known appearances in first-class matches.  He was the younger brother of Thomas Pattenden.

He played alongside his brother in a number of Kent teams from 1777 to 1781.  He may have played for Kent v Surrey in 1773 for in one account the Pattenden was William and in another it was Thomas.  This is a good example of the confusion caused when initials or first names are left out of the scorecards.  The same applies to various Woods, Mays, Rimmingtons, Whites, etc.

References

Further reading
 Ashley Mote, The Glory Days of Cricket, Robson, 1997
 David Underdown, Start of Play, Allen Lane, 2000

English cricketers
Kent cricketers
English cricketers of 1701 to 1786
1747 births
1817 deaths
East Kent cricketers